Omochroa is a monotypic moth genus in the subfamily Arctiinae. Its only species, Omochroa spurca, was described from Andalusia. Both the genus and the species were first described by Jules Pierre Rambur in 1866. The type was not saved. The species has affinity with Coscinia romei Sagarra, 1924 (Toulgoët, 1981).

References
Toulgoët, H. de (1981). "Les types des arctiides décrites par le Docteur P. Rambur [Lépidoptères Arctiidae]". Alexanor. 12 (3): 129–131. Paris.

Arctiini
Monotypic moth genera
Taxa named by Jules Pierre Rambur
Moths of Europe